Prem Prakash Singh (born October 1, 1952) and (died February 24, 2023) is an Indian politician from Samajwadi Party.village - paina(Deoria). He was elected as an MLA from Barhaj constituency in 2012. He was also questioned by Chief Electoral Officer since it was found that he was voting at two distinct locations. As per Indian law, you can only register to vote from one place.

References 

Uttar Pradesh politicians
Samajwadi Party politicians
1952 births
Living people
Samajwadi Party politicians from Uttar Pradesh